Nanci Caroline Griffith (July 6, 1953 – August 13, 2021) was an American singer, guitarist, and songwriter. She appeared many times on the PBS music program Austin City Limits starting in 1985 (season 10). In 1994 she won a Grammy Award for the album Other Voices, Other Rooms.

Griffith toured with various other artists, including Buddy Holly's band, the Crickets; John Prine; Iris DeMent; Suzy Bogguss; Judy Collins and The Everly Brothers. Griffith recorded duets with many artists, among them Emmylou Harris, Mary Black, John Prine, Don McLean, Jimmy Buffett, Dolores Keane, Willie Nelson, Adam Duritz (singer of Counting Crows), the Chieftains, John Stewart; and Darius Rucker (lead singer of Hootie & the Blowfish). Griffith had a backing band which she referred to as the Blue Moon Orchestra.

Early life and career
Nanci Griffith, the youngest of three siblings, was born in Seguin, Texas, but raised in Austin, the place her family moved to shortly after her birth. Nanci's mother Ruelene was a real estate agent and amateur actress, her father, Marlin Griffith, was a graphic artist and barbershop quartet singer.
Nanci Griffith began her career as a singer performing in a local coffeehouse, aged 12. Her father took her to see Townes Van Zandt as a teenager. At the age of 14, she did her first professional gig at the Red Lion Cabaret in downtown Austin. Nanci's debut album, There’s a Light Beyond These Woods, was released in 1978, with a cover designed by her father.

Her career spanned a variety of musical genres, predominantly country, folk, and what she termed "folkabilly." Griffith won a Grammy Award for Best Contemporary Folk Album in 1994 for her 1993 recording, Other Voices, Other Rooms. This album features Griffith covering the songs of artists who were her major influences. One of her better-known songs is "From a Distance," which was written and composed by Julie Gold, although Bette Midler's version achieved greater commercial success. Similarly, other artists have occasionally achieved greater success than Griffith herself with songs that she wrote or co-wrote. For example, Kathy Mattea had a country music top five hit with a 1986 cover of Griffith's "Love at the Five and Dime" and Suzy Bogguss had one of her largest hits with Griffith's and Tom Russell's "Outbound Plane".

In 1994, Griffith teamed up with Jimmy Webb to contribute the song "If These Old Walls Could Speak" to the AIDS benefit album Red Hot + Country produced by the Red Hot Organization. Griffith was a survivor of breast cancer which was diagnosed in 1996, and thyroid cancer in 1998.

Singer-songwriter Christine Lavin remembers the first time she saw Griffith perform:

I was struck by how perfect everything was about her singing, her playing, her talking. I realized from the get-go that this was someone who was a complete professional. Obviously she had worked a long time to get to be that good.

Griffith toured with various other artists, including Buddy Holly's band, the Crickets; John Prine; Iris DeMent; Suzy Bogguss; and Judy Collins. Griffith recorded duets with many artists, among them Emmylou Harris, Mary Black, John Prine, Don McLean, Jimmy Buffett, Dolores Keane, Willie Nelson, Adam Duritz (singer of Counting Crows), the Chieftains, musician John Stewart; and Darius Rucker (lead singer of Hootie & the Blowfish). She also contributed background vocals on many other recordings.

Griffith suffered from severe writer's block after 2004, lasting until the 2009 release of her The Loving Kind album, which contained nine selections that she had written and composed either entirely by herself or as collaborations.

After several months of limited touring in 2011, Griffith's bandmates the Kennedys (Pete & Maura Kennedy) packed up their professional Manhattan recording studio and relocated it to Nashville, where they installed it in Griffith's home. At this location, with her backing group, including Pete & Maura Kennedy and Pat McInerney, she co-produced her album Intersection over the course of the summer. The album included several new original songs and was released in April 2012 on Proper Records.

Awards
Griffith won the 1994 Grammy Award for Best Contemporary Folk Album for Other Voices, Other Rooms. She was inducted into Austin Music Hall of Fame in 1995. Griffith was awarded the Kate Wolf Memorial Award by the World Folk Music Association in 1995. In 2008, the Americana Music Association awarded her its Lifetime Americana Trailblazer Award. Lyle Lovett, who contributed backing vocals to her third album, Once in a Very Blue Moon, had won it before her. In 2010, Griffith received a Lifetime Achievement Award at BBC Radio 2 Folk Awards.

Griffith was inducted into the Texas Heritage Songwriters Association's Hall of Fame in February 2022 at the Paramount Theatre in Austin.

The Blue Moon Orchestra 
Griffith referred to her backing band as the Blue Moon Orchestra. With regard to the chosen stage name, she wrote:

The title selection of the Once in a Very Blue Moon album reached number 85 on the Billboard Hot Country Songs chart in 1986.

Current members
 Pat McInerney – percussion
 Maura Kennedy – vocals, guitar
 Pete Kennedy – guitar, vocals

Previous members
 Nanci Griffith – lead vocals, guitar
 James Hooker – piano, B-3, keyboards, vocals
 Philip Donnelly – guitar
 Clive Gregson – guitar, vocals
 Doug Lancio – electric guitar
 Thomm Jutz – guitar, vocals
 Byrd Burton – guitar
 Frank Christian – guitar
 Ron De La Vega – bass, cello
 Pete Gorisch – bass, cello
 J. T. Thomas – bass, vocals
 Denny Bixby – bass
 Pete Gordon – bass
 Le Ann Etheridge – vocals, bass guitar, rhythm guitar
 Lee Satterfield – vocals, rhythm guitar, mandolin
 Fran Breen – drums
 Steve Smith – drums
 Liam Genocky - drums

Guest backing vocalists
 Emmylou Harris
 Iris DeMent
 Lyle Lovett
 Denice Franke

Personal life 
Griffith's high school boyfriend, John, died in a motorcycle accident after taking her to the senior prom, and subsequently inspired many of her songs. She was married to singer-songwriter Eric Taylor from 1976 to 1982. In the early 1990s, she was engaged to singer-songwriter Tom Kimmel.

Death
Griffith died in Nashville on August 13, 2021, at the age of 68.  The cause of death was not reported.

Discography

Studio albums

Live albums

Compilation albums

Singles

Videography 
 Bob Dylan: The 30th Anniversary Concert Celebration Sony VHS (1993)
 Other Voices, Other Rooms Elektra Video VHS (1993)
 Winter Marquee Rounder/Universal DVD, Widescreen, (2002)
 One Fair Summer Evening...Plus! Universal Music & VI DVD, Fullscreen, (2005)

Music videos

See also 
 Music of Austin

References

External links 

 Nanci Griffith official site (archived final version 2021-02-25)
 Comprehensive Nanci Griffith discography
Chart History Nanci Griffith, Billboard 200
 Interview with Nanci Griffith, PopMatters, 2012.
 The Popdose Guide to Nanci Griffith, popdose.com, January 8, 2008
 Roger Deitz: Remembering Singer-Songwriter Nanci Griffith (1953–2021), Acousticguitar.com
 
 

1953 births
2021 deaths
20th-century American singers
20th-century American women singers
21st-century American singers
21st-century American women singers
Activists from Texas
American country singer-songwriters
American women country singers
American women singer-songwriters
American feminists
American folk guitarists
American folk singers
American pacifists
American people of Welsh descent
American women guitarists
Country musicians from Texas
Elektra Records artists
Fast Folk artists
Feminist musicians
Grammy Award winners
Guitarists from Texas
MCA Records artists
Musicians from Austin, Texas
People from Seguin, Texas
Proper Records artists
Rounder Records artists
Singer-songwriters from Texas
University of Texas alumni
Thirty Tigers artists